Frank Northey Sleeman (4 March 1915 – 1 August 2000) was Lord Mayor of Brisbane from 1976 to 1982.

Early life and education
Sleeman grew up in Redfern, Sydney. He attended Canterbury Boys' High School.

Military service and prisoner of war
Sleeman was an army lieutenant at the outbreak of the Second World War. He was captured by the Japanese and spent 3 years and 8 months as a prisoner of war in Jentsuji Prison Camp Japan.

After the war, Sleeman settled in Townsville and worked as a salesman for the Australian General Electric Company. He married Norma Robinson on 29 December 1945.

Lord Mayor of Brisbane
Major Sleeman became Lord Mayor of Brisbane in 1976 after the Labor party leader in the Brisbane City Council, Bryan Walsh, failed to hold his ward. The major project of his time in office was the building of the site for the 1982 Commonwealth Games, which is now named the Sleeman Centre in his honour.

Frank Sleeman died on 1 August 2000 in a Freemason's nursing home at Sandgate, Queensland, aged 85.

References

Books and articles

1915 births
2000 deaths
Mayors and Lord Mayors of Brisbane
Australian Labor Party mayors
People educated at Canterbury Boys' High School
Australian military personnel of World War II
Australian prisoners of war
World War II prisoners of war held by Japan